The Laboratory of Analysis-Research in Quantitative Economics (LAREQ) is a project created in 2012 at the initiative of Jean-Paul K. Tsasa to propose a new order in research in economics departments of the congolese universities.
LAREQ is composed of academics and researchers from three main Congolese universities including: University of Kinshasa, Protestant University at Congo, and Catholic University of Congo, and it is directed by a Resident Coordinator and a Deputy Coordinator.

Objectives
The general objective of LAREQ is to play an active role in the development and application of modern macroeconomic modeling in developing countries in Africa.

This general goal can be broken down into two more specific objectives:
 The production and diffusion of research
 The coaching and training of students

The production and diffusion of research
LAREQ publishes papers, under the rubric of "One pager" for undergraduate and graduate students, and belongs to the Congolese research network in quantitative economics. Since 2013, LAREQ began publish the Makroeconomica Review, a journal devoted to the development and applications of Dynamic stochastic general equilibrium models in developing countries in Africa.

The coaching and training of students
LAREQ organizes training, workshops and seminars and participates in the supervision of master and PhD dissertations.

LAREQ Medal of Excellence
The LAREQ awards annually the LAREQ Medal of Excellence for outstanding research accomplishments in economics to an African mathematician or economist under the age of 30. The objective of this award is to encourage research at an early age. The winner for 2014 is the Ivorian economist engineer Kone N'Gole.

Publications

See also
 Education in the Democratic Republic of the Congo

References

External links
 En-Official website
 Fr-Official website
 Makroeconomica Review

Economic research institutes
Research institutes in the Democratic Republic of the Congo